= Christoph Friedrich von Sacken-Appricken =

Regent of Courland, Latvia (1697–1759)

Christoph Friedrich von Sacken-Appricken (d. 1759) was the Regent of Courland starting in 1730, in modern-day Latvia.
